A base on balls (BB), also known as a walk, occurs in baseball when a batter receives four pitches that the umpire calls balls, and is in turn awarded first base without the possibility of being called out.  The base on balls is defined in Section 2.00 of baseball's Official Rules, and further detail is given in 6.08(a).

The following table lists the top 100 career base on balls leaders in Major League Baseball history. Since 2007, Barry Bonds holds the record for most career walks drawn with 2,558. Rickey Henderson (2,190), Babe Ruth (2,062), and Ted Williams (2,021) are the only other players to draw more than 2,000 walks in their careers. The active leader in walks is Albert Pujols with 1,370.

Key

List

Stats updated as of the end of the 2022 season.

Notes

References

External links

Major League Baseball statistics
Base on balls